The Deep Creek Range, (often refereed to as the Deep Creek Mountains (Goshute: Pi'a-roi-ya-bi), are a mountain range in the Great Basin located in extreme western Tooele and Juab counties in Utah, United States.
The range trends north-south (with a curl to the west at the southern end, 16% of range in White Pine County, Nevada), and is composed of granite in its central highest portion. The valley to the east is Snake Valley, and to the west is Deep Creek Valley. Nearby communities include Callao, Utah to the east and the community of Ibapah and the lands of the Confederated Tribes of the Goshute Reservation to the west.

The range is the source of several perennial streams and supports a diverse coniferous forest, with an "island" of alpine tundra on the highest summits.

References

External links

Mountain ranges of the Great Basin
Mountain ranges of Utah
Mountain ranges of Juab County, Utah
Mountain ranges of Tooele County, Utah